Looking for the Sunshine is an album by the American folk music group the Kingston Trio, released in 1983 (see 1983 in music). It was the first release comprising mostly new material since Children of the Morning in 1966. The album had little distribution, failed to chart and the two singles released from it were used for promotional purposes only. It is out of print.

History
Through the years following Bob Shane's acquisition of the Kingston Trio name in 1976, the personnel in the group changed several times, though Shane and George Grove remained constants. Shane's Kingston Trio relied heavily on a "greatest hits formula" augmented by a number of other songs acquired through the years that fans had accepted as part of the group's repertoire. Roger Gambill died shortly after the release of Looking for the Sunshine and was replaced by Bob Haworth. In March 2004, a month after his seventieth birthday, Shane suffered a debilitating heart attack that forced him into a retirement from touring and performing for the first time in 47 years. Future releases after Looking for the Sunshine by the various line-ups of the group (including the return of original member Nick Reynolds) would consist of recordings of live performances and a large number of compilations of their Capitol and Decca recordings.

Track listing

Side one
"Looking for the Sunshine" (Mickey Newbury)
 "Hawaiian Nights" (Harold Payne, Edgar Pease, Mike Scarpiello)
 "I Like to Hear the Rain" (Alex Harvey)
 "Big Ship Glory" (Charlie Merriam)
 "Sometimes Love Is Better When It's Gone" (Mike Settle)
"I'm a Rake and a Ramblin' Boy"

Side two

"The World Needs a Melody" (Johnny Slate, Larry Henley, H. Delaughter)
 "The Long Black Veil" (Danny Dill, Marijohn Wilkin)
"Will You Love Me If I Don't do Coke?" (Harold Payne)
"Cortelia Clark" (Mickey Newbury)
"A Rolling Stone" (Stan Wilson)
"Easy to Arrange" (Jak Kelly)

Personnel
Bob Shane – vocals, guitar
Roger Gambill – vocals, guitar
George Grove – vocals, banjo, guitar
Stan Kaess – bass
Tom Green – drums, percussion
Ben Schubert – fiddle, banjo, tenor guitar
John Sebastian – autoharp, harmonica
Mike Settle – piano ("Looking for the Sunshine")
Jane Watson – harmony vocals ("I Like to Hear the Rain")
Brian Mann – synthesizer ("Hawaiian Nights")
Wilkins Hy Ching – ukulele ("Hawaiian Nights")
David Benoit – piano ("The World Needs a Melody")

Production notes
Mike Settle – producer
Nick Heyl – executive producer, producer ("Will You Love Me If I Don't do Coke?")
Jane Heyl – executive producer
Hank Doing – engineer
Eddy Offord – engineer
Ross Neurer – photography, art director
Nick Reynolds – liner notes

References

External links
 Liner Notes

1983 albums
The Kingston Trio albums